Matai Hakor is a cave located in the Khagrachari district of southeastern Bangladesh. It is located at the foot of Alutila hill. It is one of the tourist destinations in Khagrachari.

Location
The cave is located in Matiranga Upazila in Khagrachari Hill District of southeastern Bangladesh.

References

Khagrachhari District
Mountains of Bangladesh
Tourist attractions in Bangladesh